Makri (Greek: Μάκρη) is a village and a municipal district of the city of Alexandroupoli, Evros regional unit, Greece. In 2011 its population was 924 for the village, and 1,919 for the municipal district. It is situated on the Aegean Sea coast, 12 km west of downtown Alexandroupoli. Makri has an exit on the Egnatia Odos motorway, that passes north of the village.

Subdivisions

Makri, pop. 924 in 2011
Dikella, pop. 290
Ennato, pop. 268
Koimisi Theotokou, pop. 48
Mesimvria, pop. 145
Panorama, pop. 37
Paralia Dikellon, pop. 102
Plaka, pop. 105

Population

History
Makri was ruled by the Ottoman Empire until the Balkan Wars of 1912 under the name Miri. It became a part of Bulgaria after 1912. In 1920 it became a part of Greece, and in 1941–1944 it was re-occupied by Bulgarian forces during the Axis Occupation of Greece.

Gallery

See also

List of settlements in the Evros regional unit

External links
Makri on GTP Travel Pages

References

Alexandroupolis
Populated places in Evros (regional unit)